This is the results breakdown of the local elections held in Extremadura on 22 May 2011. The following tables show detailed results in the autonomous community's most populous municipalities, sorted alphabetically.

City control
The following table lists party control in the most populous municipalities, including provincial capitals (shown in bold). Gains for a party are displayed with the cell's background shaded in that party's colour.

Municipalities

Almendralejo
Population: 30,741

Badajoz
Population: 150,376

Cáceres
Population: 94,179

Mérida
Population: 57,127

Plasencia
Population: 41,447

See also
2011 Extremaduran regional election

References

Extremadura
2011